Barnkowo  is a village in the administrative district of Gmina Chojna, within Gryfino County, West Pomeranian Voivodeship, in north-western Poland, close to the German border.

Before 1945 the area was part of Brandenburg (Frankfurt Region) within Prussia, Germany. For the history of the region, see New March.

The village has a population of 28.

Notable residents
Werner Gust (1910–1979), Wehrmacht officer

References

Barnkowo